Atle Pedersen Rønsen (born 13 August 1988) is a Norwegian ski jumper. His best individual World Cup finish is 11th in Bischofshofen on 6 January 2012. His best successes have been in the Continental Cup, where he has won four times.

External links

1988 births
Living people
Norwegian male ski jumpers